James Warren may refer to:

 James Warren (actor) (1913–2001), American film actor and artist
 James Warren (engineer) (1806–1908), British engineer who patented the Warren-type truss bridge in 1848
 James Warren (journalist) (born 1953), Huffington Post blogger, former Chicago Tribune managing editor
 James Warren (musician and composer), member of bands Stackridge and The Korgis
 James Warren (politician) (1726–1808), Provincial Congress of Massachusetts President; general in American Revolution
 James Warren (presidential candidate), Socialist Workers Party candidate for United States President in 1988 and 1992
 James Warren (publisher) (born 1930), magazine publisher and founder of Warren Publishing
 James D. Warren, American newspaper publisher and politician from New York
 James Ronald Warren (1925–2012), Seattle historian
 James S. Warren, former director-general of the counter-terrorism branch of the Canadian Security Intelligence Service
 Jamie Warren (born 1961), country music singer-songwriter
 Jimmy Warren (1939–2006), American college and professional football cornerback

See also
 Jim Warren (disambiguation)
 Warren James (1792–1841), English miners' leader